The 2018 CONCACAF League (officially the 2018 Scotiabank CONCACAF League for sponsorship purposes) was the second edition of the CONCACAF League, a football club competition organized by CONCACAF, the regional governing body of North America, Central America, and the Caribbean.

Herediano defeated Motagua in the final to win their first CONCACAF League, and qualified for the 2019 CONCACAF Champions League to join the 15 direct entrants. Olimpia were the title holders, but did not qualify for this tournament and were unable to defend their title, and consequently their streak of participating in all ten editions of the CONCACAF Champions League since 2008 ended.

Qualification
A total of 16 teams participate in the CONCACAF League:
Central American Zone: 13 teams (from six associations; ordinarily from seven associations, but Guatemalan teams were excluded from this season's tournament)
Caribbean Zone: 3 teams (from two or three associations)

Therefore, teams from either 8 or 9 out of the 41 CONCACAF member associations may participate in the CONCACAF League.

Central America
The 13 berths for the Central American Football Union (UNCAF) are allocated to the seven UNCAF member associations as follows: two berths for each of Costa Rica, El Salvador, Guatemala, Honduras, Panama, and Nicaragua, and one berth for Belize.

All of the leagues of Central America employ a split season with two tournaments in one season, so the following teams qualify for the CONCACAF League:
In the league of Costa Rica, the champions with the worse aggregate record, and the non-champions with the best aggregate record, qualify. If there is any team which are champions of both tournaments, the non-champions with the second best aggregate record qualify.
In the leagues of El Salvador, Guatemala, Honduras, and Panama, the champions with the worse aggregate record, and the runners-up with the better aggregate record (or any team which are runners-up of both tournaments), qualify. If there is any team which are finalists of both tournaments, the runners-up with the worse aggregate record qualify. If there are any two teams which are finalists of both tournaments, the semi-finalists with the best aggregate record qualify.
In the league of Nicaragua, both champions qualify. If there is any team which are champions of both tournaments, the runners-up with the better aggregate record (or any team which are runners-up of both tournaments) qualify.
In the league of Belize, the champions with the better aggregate record (or any team which are champions of both tournaments) qualify.

If teams from any Central American associations are excluded, they are replaced by teams from other Central American associations, with the associations chosen based on results from previous CONCACAF League and CONCACAF Champions League tournaments. For this season, the two teams from Guatemala were excluded due to the suspension of their federation by FIFA and were replaced by an additional team each from Costa Rica and Panama.

Caribbean
The three berths for the Caribbean Football Union (CFU), which consists of 31 member associations, are allocated via the CONCACAF Caribbean Club Championship and CONCACAF Caribbean Club Shield, the first-tier and second-tier subcontinental Caribbean club tournaments. Since 2018, the CONCACAF Caribbean Club Championship is open to teams from professional leagues, and the CONCACAF Caribbean Club Shield is open to teams from non-professional leagues. To qualify for the CONCACAF Caribbean Club Championship, teams have to finish as the champions or runners-up of their respective association's league in the previous season, while to qualify for the CONCACAF Caribbean Club Shield, teams have to finish as the champions of their respective association's league in the previous season.

The runners-up and third-placed team of the CONCACAF Caribbean Club Championship, and the winners of a playoff between the fourth-placed team of the CONCACAF Caribbean Club Championship and the champions of the CONCACAF Caribbean Club Shield, qualify for the CONCACAF League. For the champions of the CONCACAF Caribbean Club Shield to be eligible for the playoff, they must comply with the minimum CONCACAF Club Licensing requirements for the CONCACAF League.

Teams
The following 16 teams (from eight associations) qualified for the tournament.

Notes

Draw

The draw for the 2018 CONCACAF League was held on 23 May 2018, 19:00 EDT (UTC−4), at the Pullman Hotel in Miami.

The draw determined each tie in the round of 16 (numbered 1 through 8) between a team from Pot 1 and a team from Pot 2, each containing eight teams. The "Bracket Position Pots" (Pot A and Pot B) contained the bracket positions numbered 1 through 8 corresponding to each tie. The teams from Pot 1 were assigned a bracket position from Pot A and the teams from Pot 2 were assigned a bracket position from Pot B. Teams from the same association could not be drawn against each other in the round of 16 except for "wildcard" teams which replaced a team from another association.

The seeding of teams were based on the CONCACAF Club Index. Each team qualified for the CONCACAF League based on criteria set by the respective associations (e.g., tournament champions, runners-up, cup champions), resulting in an assigned slot (e.g., CRC2, CRC3) for each team. The CONCACAF Club Index, instead of ranking each team, was based on the on-field performance of the teams that have occupied the respective qualifying slots in the previous five editions of the CONCACAF League and CONCACAF Champions League. To determine the total points awarded to a slot in any single edition of the CONCACAF League or CONCACAF Champions League, CONCACAF used the following formula:

The 16 teams were distributed in the pots as follows:

Notes

Format
In the CONCACAF League, the 16 teams played a single-elimination tournament. Each tie was played on a home-and-away two-legged basis.
In the round of 16, quarter-finals, and semi-finals, the away goals rule would be applied if the aggregate score was tied after the second leg. If still tied, the penalty shoot-out would be used to determine the winner (Regulations II, Article F).
In the final, the away goals rule would not be applied, and extra time would be played if the aggregate score was tied after the second leg. If the aggregate score was still tied after extra time, the penalty shoot-out would be used to determine the winner (Regulations II, Article G).

Schedule
The schedule of the competition was as follows.

All times are Eastern Daylight Time, i.e., UTC−4, as listed by CONCACAF (local times are in parentheses).

Bracket

Round of 16
In the round of 16, the matchups were decided by draw: R16-1 through R16-8. The teams from Pot 1 in the draw hosted the second leg.

Summary
The first legs were played on 31 July – 2 August, and the second legs were played on 7–9 August 2018.

|}

Matches

3–3 on aggregate. Portmore United won 7–6 on penalties.

Motagua won 3–0 on aggregate.

1–1 on aggregate. Walter Ferretti won 4–1 on penalties.

Tauro won 2–1 on aggregate.

Árabe Unido won 4–2 on aggregate.

FAS won 3–2 on aggregate.

Universitario won 7–1 on aggregate.

2–2 on aggregate. Herediano won on away goals.

Quarter-finals
In the quarter-finals, the matchups were determined as follows:
QF1: Winner R16-1 vs. Winner R16-2
QF2: Winner R16-3 vs. Winner R16-4
QF3: Winner R16-5 vs. Winner R16-6
QF4: Winner R16-7 vs. Winner R16-8
The winners of round of 16 matchups 1, 3, 5, 7 hosted the second leg.

Summary
The first legs were played on 21–23 August, and the second legs were played on 28–30 August 2018.

|}

Matches

Motagua won 5–2 on aggregate.

Tauro won 7–1 on aggregate.

Árabe Unido won 4–1 on aggregate.

Herediano won 5–1 on aggregate.

Semi-finals
In the semi-finals, the matchups were determined as follows:
SF1: Winner QF1 vs. Winner QF2
SF2: Winner QF3 vs. Winner QF4
The semi-finalists in each tie which had the better performance in previous rounds hosted the second leg.

Summary
The first legs were played on 20 September, and the second legs were played on 27 September 2018.

|}

Matches

Motagua won 3–2 on aggregate.

Herediano won 2–1 on aggregate.

Final

In the final (Winner SF1 vs. Winner SF2), the finalists which had the better performance in previous rounds hosted the second leg.

Summary
The first leg was played on 25 October, and the second leg was played on 1 November 2018.

|}

Matches

Herediano won 3–2 on aggregate.

Top goalscorers

Awards
The following awards were given at the conclusion of the tournament:

See also
2019 CONCACAF Champions League

Notes

References

External links

 
2018
2
2019 CONCACAF Champions League
July 2018 sports events in North America
August 2018 sports events in North America
September 2018 sports events in North America
October 2018 sports events in North America
November 2018 sports events in North America